"Don't Worry" is the debut solo single of English musician Kim Appleby from her self-titled debut solo album (1990). This was Appleby's first solo-single after the death of her sister Mel. The song addresses the process of getting over being heartbroken. With the aid of her then boyfriend, ex-Bros bassist Craig Logan, Kim launched a solo career with much of her debut solo album composed of songs co-written with Mel, for what was intended to be the next Mel and Kim album. The new album showed Appleby in a more prominent, soulful role, although the tongue-in-cheek humour of Mel & Kim still remained.

Released on 22 October 1990, the song reached number two on the UK Singles Chart in November 1990 and entered the top 40 throughout Europe. The single was also one of the best played singles on both IR stations and the BBC for a month. Additionally it peaked within the top 10 in Austria, Belgium, Finland, Germany, Ireland, the Netherlands and Switzerland. On the Eurochart Hot 100, "Don't Worry" reached number seven in December 1990. In Zimbabwe, the single reached number one in January 1991.

Critical reception
Pan-European magazine Music & Media described the song as a "hit-bound record with a strong Motown (Supremes) feel. Co-written by Appleby and former Bros member Craig Logan, this is an up-tempo, cheerful and well produced song." Selina Webb from Music Week felt that this release "is tinged with considerable sadness, as it should have been performed by a duo." She added that it "lacks the SAW magic but stands up as an easily-consumed pop song which should bop its way easily into the charts." R.S. Murthi from New Straits Times said it "sounds so much like Stock/Aitken/Waterman that you're disappointed to discover that it's not their work." Tom Doyle from Smash Hits wrote that the song is "something of a bouncy singalong SAW-type affair" and added that Appleby's voice is "consistently strong and tuneful".

Music video
A music video was produced to promote the single, directed by Liam Kan. It received heavy rotation on MTV Europe.

Track listings
 CD single
 "Don't Worry" – 3:33
 "Don't Worry" (The Phil Chill mix) – 4:37
 "Don't Worry" (The Stressed Out mix) – 7:51

 7-inch single
 "Don't Worry" – 3:31
 "Don't Worry" (instrumental) – 3:50

 12-inch single
 "Don't Worry" (The Stressed Out mix) – 7:52
 "Don't Worry" (The Phil Chill mix) – 4:36
 "Don't Worry" (Crypt mix) – 4:54

Charts and certifications

Weekly charts

Year-end charts

Certifications

References

1990 debut singles
1990 songs
Kim Appleby songs
Music videos directed by Liam Kan
Number-one singles in Zimbabwe
Parlophone singles
Songs written by Craig Logan